The  is a railway line in Kanagawa Prefecture, Japan, operated by the private railway operator Sagami Railway (Sotetsu).

Services
Services on the Izumino Line operate as a branch of the Main Line, with most trains running through to and from Yokohama via the Main Line.
 Local (各停) services stop at all stations to Futamatagawa, and some services continue to Yokohama stopping at all stations on the Main Line.
 Rapid (快速) services stop at all stations to Futamatagawa, and continue to Yokohama stopping only at Tsurugamine, Nishiya, and Hoshikawa.
 Commuter Express services stop at all stations to Futamatagawa.
 Commuter Limited Express (通勤特急) services stop between Shōnandai and Yokohama stopping only at Izumino,  Futamatagawa, Tsurugamine, and Nishiya.

Station list
 Local and rapid services stop at all stations; while commuter limited express services stop between Futamatagawa and Shōnandai only at Izumino.

History

The first section of the line, between Futamatagawa and Izumino, opened on April 8, 1976, with Izumi-chūō station opening on April 4, 1990. A further extension to Shōnandai opened on March 10, 1999. On February 27, 1999, Rapid service trains started operation.

Future developments 
One of the station is to be built near the Keio University Shonan Fujisawa Campus. As a new station is proposed to be built on the Tōkaidō Shinkansen near Kurami, the proposed terminus may become an interchange station with the Shinkansen.

See also
 List of railway lines in Japan

References 

Lines of Sagami Railway
Railway lines in Kanagawa Prefecture
Railway lines opened in 1976
1067 mm gauge railways in Japan
1976 establishments in Japan